Gmina Strzyżewice is a rural gmina (administrative district) in Lublin County, Lublin Voivodeship, in eastern Poland.

Villages
Gmina Strzyżewice contains the villages and settlements of Borkowizna, Bystrzyca Nowa, Bystrzyca Stara, Dębina, Dębszczyzna, Franciszków, Iżyce, Kajetanówka, Kiełczewice Dolne, Kiełczewice Górne, Kiełczewice Maryjskie, Kiełczewice Pierwsze, Kolonia Kiełczewice Dolne, Osmolice, Pawłów, Pawłówek, Piotrowice, Polanówka, Pszczela Wola, Strzyżewice and Żabia Wola.

Neighbouring gminas
Gmina Strzyżewice is bordered by the gminas of Bychawa, Głusk, Jabłonna, Niedrzwica Duża, Wilkołaz and Zakrzówek.

References

Strzyzewice
Lublin County